Dune: House Corrino is a 2001 science fiction novel by Brian Herbert and Kevin J. Anderson, set in the fictional Dune universe created by Frank Herbert. It is the third book in the Prelude to Dune prequel trilogy, which takes place before the events of Frank Herbert's celebrated 1965 novel Dune. The Prelude to Dune novels draw from notes left behind by Frank Herbert after his death.

Dune: House Corrino debuted at #8 on The New York Times Best Seller list.

Plot summary
One year after the War of Assassins, Duke Leto Atreides sponsors an assault on Ix to reclaim the planet for House Vernius, while his concubine Jessica is pregnant with his son. Emperor Shaddam IV commences his Great Spice War to create a dependency on his soon-to-be-released synthetic melange, ajidamal. The Bene Gesserit eagerly await the birth of the Kwisatz Haderach's mother by Jessica; little do they know that things are not going to turn out exactly how they intend.

Reception
Dune: House Corrino debuted at #8 on The New York Times Best Seller list.

References

External links
 Prelude to Dune official site

2001 American novels
2001 science fiction novels
Dune (franchise) novels
Novels by Kevin J. Anderson
Novels by Brian Herbert
Novels published posthumously
Bantam Spectra books